Raffles v Wichelhaus [1864] EWHC Exch J19, often called "The Peerless" case, is a leading case on mutual mistake in English contract law. The case established that where there is latent ambiguity as to an essential element of the contract, the Court will attempt to find a reasonable interpretation from the context of the agreement before it will void it.

The case's fame is bolstered by the ironic coincidence contained within: each party had in mind a particular ship, with no knowledge of the other's existence, yet each ship was named Peerless.

Facts
Raffles is the cotton supplier.
Wichelhaus is the cotton purchaser.
There is a steep drop in prices between October and December.
Wichelhaus does not want the December cotton delivery because of the drop in cotton prices.

The claimant (Raffles) entered into a contract to sell 125 bales of Surat cotton at fair market price to the defendant (Wichelhaus) at the rate of  d. per pound. The contract specified that the cotton would be arriving in Liverpool on the ship Peerless from Bombay ("to arrive ex Peerless from Bombay").  

It so happened that there were two British ships named Peerless arriving in Liverpool from Bombay, one departing in October and another departing in December.  The defendant, according to statements presented in court, thought the contract was for cotton on the October ship while the claimant thought the contract was for the cotton on the December ship. When the December Peerless arrived, the claimant (Raffles) tried to deliver it, however the defendant repudiated the agreement, saying that their contract was for the cotton on the October Peerless.

The claimant sued for breach of contract, arguing that the date of the ship was not relevant and the only purpose of specifying the name of the ship is that in the contingency that the ship sink en route, the contract could be voided.

The issue before the Court was whether the defendant should be bound by the agreement to buy the cotton of the claimant's Peerless.

Judgment
Though courts will strive to find a reasonable interpretation in order to preserve the agreement whenever possible, the court in Raffles could not determine which ship named Peerless was intended in the contract. Consequently, as there was no consensus ad idem ("meeting of the minds"), the two parties did not agree to the same thing and there was no binding contract. This is a classic example of mutual mistake, wherein both parties misunderstood the contract. Therefore, the defendants prevailed, and did not have to pay.

In this case, the defendant demurred, seeking dismissal. The Court agreed.

See also
Mistakes in English law
Interpreting contracts in English law

References

External links
 Clarification of the report of Raffles v. Wichelhaus

English contract case law
1864 in case law
1864 in British law
Court of Exchequer Chamber cases